The Department of Sports, Arts and Culture (DSAC) is a department of the Government of South Africa with responsibility for sport, arts, culture and heritage. It was created in June 2019 by the merger of the Department of Arts and Culture with Sport and Recreation South Africa.

References

External links 
 

Sports, Arts and Culture
Sports ministries
Sport in South Africa
South African culture
South Africa